Gran Canaria, also Grand Canary Island, is the third-largest and second-most-populous island of the Canary Islands, an archipelago off the Atlantic coast of Northwest Africa which is part of Spain.  the island had a population of  that constitutes approximately 40% of the population of the archipelago.
Las Palmas de Gran Canaria, the capital of the island, is the biggest city of the Canary Islands and the ninth of Spain.

Gran Canaria is also the third most populated island in Spain.

History
In antiquity, Gran Canaria was populated by the North African Canarii, who may have arrived as early as 500 BC.  In the medieval period, after over a century of European incursions and attempts at conquest, the island was conquered on April 29, 1483, by the Crown of Castile, under Queen Isabella I. The conquest succeeded after a campaign that lasted five years, and it was an important step towards the expansion of the unified Spain.

The capital city of Las Palmas de Gran Canaria was founded on June 24, 1478, under the name "Real de Las Palmas", by Juan Rejón, head of the invading Castilian army. In 1492, Christopher Columbus anchored in the Port of Las Palmas (and spent some time on the island) on his first trip to the Americas. Las Palmas de Gran Canaria is, jointly with Santa Cruz de Tenerife, the capital of the autonomous community of the Canary Islands.

Etymology 
Pliny claimed that the island was called this way for the dogs on the island, of which two were presented as a gift to Juba, King of Mauretania.  This opinion is disputed as when the Europeans arrived on the island, no dogs were found. Another source suggested the way the natives ate fish was doglike and this was the reason for its name. A more plausible assumption is that the islands name derives from the people Canario or Canarii living near the Atlas mountain range. Jean de Béthencourt named the island Gran Canaria as the people on the island were valorous opponents to his conquest. The Canarii called the island Tamarán ('land of the brave").

Geography 

Gran Canaria is located in the Canary Islands archipelago southeast of Tenerife and west of Fuerteventura. The island is of volcanic origin, mostly made of fissure vents. The coastline measures 236 km.

Geology 
About 80% of the volume of the island was formed during the Miocene period eruptions, between 14 and 9 million years ago. This cycle continued with the emission of trachytes, phonolites and peralkaline rocks. This period was followed by one of erosion, which lasted some 4 million years.

A second cycle of volcanic eruptions, known as the "Roque Nublo cycle", took place between 4.5 and 3.4 million years ago. Most of the inland peaks were formed by erosion from these materials. This period also started with fissural basalts, but ended with violent eruptions of pyroclastic flows. Some phonolitic features, like the Risco Blanco, were also formed in its last stages.

The third or recent cycle is held to have started some 2.8 million years ago and is considered to be still active. The last eruptions are held to have occurred some 2000 years ago.

The changes in volume and, therefore, weight of the island have also caused the island to rise above the previous sea level during erosive periods and to sink during eruptive periods. Some of these "fossil beaches" can be seen in the cliff faces of the more eroded northern coast.

Vegetation 

Until the conquest, Gran Canaria had extensive forests, but then suffered extensive deforestation as a result of continuous logging, land divisions and other intensive uses. This reduced the forest cover to just , making the island the most deforested of the Canary Islands. However, in the twentieth century reforestation of the ridge of the island was begun, recovering some of the lost forest mass. Much of the summit of the island is forested mostly due to reforestation.

Governance

Gran Canaria is in the autonomous community of the Canary Islands (Islas Canarias). It lies within the Province of Las Palmas, a Spanish province which consists of the eastern part of the Canary Islands community. Las Palmas de Gran Canaria is the provincial capital, one of the two capitals of the Canary Islands along with Santa Cruz de Tenerife.

The island of Gran Canaria is governed by the Cabildo insular de Gran Canaria. Gran Canaria Island itself is divided into twenty-one smaller municipalities:

The island has a population at the start of 2019 of 851,231 with 379,925 of those in the capital city of Las Palmas de Gran Canaria. Gran Canaria is the second most populous island of the Canary Islands, after Tenerife.

Transportation

Roads

Gran Canaria has roads encircling the whole island and extending into the mountain areas. In the late 20th century, its dual carriageway, among the first in the Canary Islands, were opened and run around Las Palmas de Gran Canaria, and were later extended to the north coast and the airport and subsequently to the south coast in response to increased tourist traffic. The only highway of Gran Canaria are GC1. Dual carriageway is GC2, and GC31, GC4 and GC5. The western and the north-western parts, with the fewest inhabitants, are linked only with main roads.

Buses
Public transport around Gran Canaria is provided by an extensive bus network, known in the local dialect as guaguas. The Autoridad Única del Transporte de Gran Canaria (Gran Canaria Transport Authority, TGC) manages the network and operates a number of bus stations across the island, including San Telmo and Santa Catalina bus stations in Las Palmas, Maspalomas and Galdar. Bus tickets may be purchased with cash, and AUTGC also operates a contactless electronic ticket called the TransGC Card, which is valid across the whole network.

Inter-urban bus services across the island are operated by the Global bus company. Global was created in 2000 after the merger of two bus companies, Utinsa (which operated in the north of the island) and Salcai (the bus operator for the south). Local bus services in Las Palmas are run by the municipal bus company, Guaguas Municipales de Las Palmas de Gran Canaria.

Airport
Gran Canaria Airport (IATA: LPA) is the only commercial airport on the island. The large number of aircraft and passengers passing through it each year make it one of the busiest in Spain. Gran Canaria is also responsible for all air traffic control in the Canaries. By destination island, Gran Canaria is the second island that congregates the largest number of passengers in the Canary Islands.Car rental companies that have offices in the airports are: Autoreisen, Avis, Cicar, Europcar, Goldcar (only south airport), Hertz, Sixt and TopCar.

Sea ports
The most important ports in the island are the Port of Las Palmas (Puerto de la Luz), in the city of Las Palmas de Gran Canaria; Arguineguín, which exports cement from a large factory; and Arinaga, located in the main industrial zone of Canaries and one of the major ones of Spain.

The main passenger ports are the Port of La Luz, where Trasmediterránea operates a weekly ferry route to Cadiz on the Spanish mainland, and the Port of Las Nieves, located in Agaete on the west side of the island, where Fred Olsen Express operates a catamaran ferry service to Santa Cruz de Tenerife.

Train
Plans for a Tren de Gran Canaria railway network linking the capital with the south have been approved by both the Gran Canaria Cabildo and the autonomous Canary Islands' Government, though the discussion with the central Spanish Government hinges now on budget. The planned  railway line would run between Las Palmas and Meloneras, with the section in the capital running entirely underground as far as the suburb of Jinámar. The line is planned to have 11 stations, including an underground station at Gran Canaria Airport. The scheme was first announced in 2009, with a planned operational date in 2015. A public company called Ferrocarriles de Gran Canaria has been formed by the Cabildo's Gran Canaria Transport Authority. Plans were still being discussed in 2018.

Climate 

According to the Köppen climate classification, Gran Canaria is considered to have a desert climate (Bwh) due to its severe lack of precipitation. Gran Canaria has consistent warm temperatures in spring, summer and autumn, and mild winters. Gran Canaria is noted for its rich variety of microclimates. Some cool nights occur in winter, but lows below  are unknown near the coast. Inland the climate is still mild but mountainous areas see the occasional frost or snow. Annual rainfall averages , most of this falling in the cooler months, with July, August and September normally rainless. Rainfall is unevenly distributed through the island with some areas being much drier than others.
Cloud cover and sunshine is often quite variable during the cooler months, and there can be several rather cloudy days at times in winter. Summers are generally quite sunny however, with the south of the island being most favoured.

Agriculture 

Gran Canaria agriculture is unique among the Canaries islands in that it was traditionally dominated by plantations, with much of these being grains as well as sugarcane, rather than by stock-breeding. The caves of Valerón (a property of cultural interest in the "archaeological site" category) in the municipality of Santa María de Guía bears testimony of it by being the largest pre-Hispanic collective granary of the Canaries.

Tourism 

This island is called a "miniature continent" due to the different climates and variety of landscapes found, with long beaches and dunes of white sand, contrasting with green ravines and picturesque villages. A third of the island is under protection as a Biosphere Reserve by UNESCO.

The number of annual visitors was 3.6 million in 2014 (of which 450.000 Spaniards). Most of the tourists visit the southern part of the island. The north tends to be cooler, while the south is warmer and sunny. The east coast of the island is flat, dotted with beaches, while the western coast is rockier and mountainous.

The island possesses 32 Natural Protected Spaces, notably the Rural Park of Nublo, The Doramas Jungle, the Azuaje Ravine, Tamadaba, Pino Santo, etc.

In the south there is a large bird park, Palmitos Park, as well as many beach resort communities. Resorts are concentrated in the central eastern part of the southern coast in the Maspalomas area, which includes the towns of San Agustín, Playa del Inglés and Meloneras. The Maspalomas Dunes are located between Playa del Inglés ("The Englishman's Beach") and the distinctive 19th century Maspalomas lighthouse. Playa del Ingles is home to the Yumbo Centre, which was opened in 1982 and has almost 200 shops, including bars, restaurants, cafes, fashion boutiques, electronic outlets and jewellery stores.

In Tarajalillo, an Aeroclub exists from where tourist flights can be taken over the island.

Still further to the west along the southern shore, in the Municipality of Mogán, are the communities of Puerto Rico and Puerto de Mogán, a village referred to as "Little Venice" on account of its many canals.

Other attractions include Cocodrilos Park, Roque Nublo (an 80 m monolith), Cenobio de Valerón with more than 350 storage cavities, Painted cave of Galdar the most important archaeological park in Canary Islands, or the botanical gardens Jardín Canario (in Tafira Alta) and Cactualdea (in La Aldea de San Nicolás).

El Dedo de Dios, or "God's Finger", was a rocky spire jutting from the sea in Puerto de las Nieves, and was previously the signature attraction of the Canary Islands until it was destroyed by tropical storm Delta that crossed the archipelago in November 2005.

Other well-known rock formations are El Cura (also known as El Fraile), The Frog (La Rana), Roque Bentayga, the Roque de Gando, and the Peñón Bermejo.

The capital city is Las Palmas de Gran Canaria. Las Canteras beach, a protected area and diving zone, lies in the heart of the city. Las Palmas de Gran Canaria is also known for its annual carnaval. It was the first stop of Christopher Columbus' expedition on his way back from the Americas, a commemoration of which is the Hermitage of San Antonio Abad, where the navigator prayed, and the Casa de Colón. Other attractions in the capital city include the Museo Canario (the most important archaeology museum in the archipelago), the cathedral and the Plaza del Espíritu Santo. In Teror the shrine of Virgen del Pino ("Virgin of the Pine"), patron saint of Gran Canaria, can be found. Its feast is celebrated on September 8.

The town of Agüimes, on the eastern part of the island, has been carefully restored and its town centre, centered on its old church and a peaceful square, now evokes the quiet living of a traditional Canarian town. The district also has some of the best preserved cave dwellings, in the protected area of the Guayadeque ravine, where even the church has been built into the mountainside and visitors can find a number of popular cave restaurants. The district also includes the most renowned scuba diving area on the island: the marine reserve at the playa de El Cabrón just outside the town of Arinaga.

Other important towns are Telde, known among other things for their surf schools in Salinetas, Vecindario (within the municipality of Santa Lucía de Tirajana) and Gáldar, that contains an important diving zone. In Arucas there is a Neogothic temple, popularly known as "Arucas' Cathedral", as well as a large fertile plain where bananas are grown. In Gáldar and its surroundings there is also a banana-growing plain and some remarkable archaeological remains, such as the Painted cave of Galdar or the cenobio de Valerón's communal silos, ancient tombs (among which the necropolis of Maipés), and the port of Sardina del Norte (one of the island's ports where, as in Las Palmas', Christopher Columbus used to get supplies for his ships).

Heading west along the southern coast is the fishing city of Arguineguín in the Municipality of Mogán.

Natural symbols 

The official natural symbols associated with Gran Canaria are Canary Mastiff and Euphorbia canariensis'' (Cardón)

Beaches 
 Playa de Maspalomas
 Playa de Meloneras
 Playa de las Canteras
 Playa Dedo de Dios
 Playa de Güi Güi
 Playa de Amadores
 Playa de Tufia y Aguadulce
 Playa de Tiritaña

Protected natural areas 

Nearly half of the island territory —  (42.7% of island) — is under protection from the Red Canaria de Espacios Naturales Protegidos (Canary Islands Network for Protected Natural Areas). Of the 146 protected sites under control of network in the Canary Islands archipelago, a total of 33 are located in Gran Canaria, the second most protected island in the group.
  There are seven different categories of protection:
 Six nature reserves — El Brezal, Azuaje, Los Tilos de Moya, Los Marteles, Las Dunas de Maspalomas and Güigüi (total 7,153.1 ha)
 Two integral nature reserves — Inagua and Barranco Oscuro (total 3,955,5 ha)
 Two natural parks — Tamadaba and Pilancones (total 13,333 ha)
 Two rural parks — Nublo and Doramas (total 29,893.4 ha)
 Ten natural monuments — Amagro, Bandama, Montañón Negro, Roque de Aguayro, Tauro, Arinaga, Barranco de Guayadeque, Riscos de Tirajana, Roque Nublo and Barranco del Draguillo (total 5,264.9 ha)
 Seven protected landscapes — La Isleta (in the capital Las Palmas de Gran Canaria), Pino Santo, Tafira, Las Cumbres, Lomo Magullo, Fataga and Montaña de Agüimes (total 12,680.9 ha)
 Four sites of scientific interest — Jinámar, Tufia, Roque de Gando and Juncalillo del Sur (total 276.2 ha).

Music
Phalmuter (2006−present), a Spanish heavy metal/hard rock band from Gran Canaria.

Science and technology

In the 1960s, Gran Canaria was selected as the location for one of the 14 ground stations in the Manned Space Flight Network (MSFN) to support the NASA space program. Maspalomas Station, located in the south of the island, took part in a number of space missions including the Apollo 11 Moon landings and Skylab. Today it continues to support satellite communications as part of the ESA network.

Sports 

The island is home to CB Gran Canaria – a basketball club playing in Liga ACB at the Gran Canaria Arena, with a capacity of 11,000.
The island is also home to UD Las Palmas – a football club playing in Segunda División at the Estadio de Gran Canaria, with a capacity of 32,392.

See also 

Zona franca de las Palmas de Gran Canaria

Bibliography

Geology of Gran Canaria
 , pp. 97–136

References

External links 

Gran Canaria Tourist Board official site 

 
Biosphere reserves of Spain
Fissure vents
Islands of the Canary Islands
Volcanoes of the Canary Islands